Norman Carr Paine (January 6, 1893 – February 13, 1955) was an American football and basketball player and coach, college athletics administrator, and physician. He served as the head football coach at Baylor University (1913), the University of Arkansas (1917–1918), and Iowa State University (1920), compiling a career college football coaching record of 16–11–3. Paine was also the head basketball coach at Baylor during the 1913–14 season, tallying a mark of 1–8. He was the athletic director at Baylor from 1913 to 1914. Paine later practiced medicine in Los Angeles County, California.

Early life and playing career
Paine was a native of Chicago, Illinois. He attended Wendell Phillips Academy High School and played football there as a tackle. He then moved on to the University of Chicago, where he played for the Chicago Maroons football team under Amos Alonzo Stagg. In his first year at the university, Paine played as a guard on the freshman football team. He made the varsity football team as sophomore and played guard and defensive halfback. As a junior and senior he was the starting quarterback for the Maroons. Paine was also a member of the Chicago Maroons men's basketball team.

Coaching career
Paine was the head football coach at Baylor University in 1913. His record there stands at 4–4–2. From 1917 to 1918, he served as the head coach at the University of Arkansas, posting an 8–3–1 record. In 1920, he served as the coach at Iowa State University posting a 4–4 record.

Medical career and later life
Paine graduated from Rush Medical College and was the head of the campus infirmary at Iowa State as well as the football coach. Paine
was on the national board of the YMCA, served Los Angeles County Hospital for 30 years and was a physician in Glendale, California. Paine was an honored alumni of the University of Chicago and headed the Big Ten Club of Southern California and the Quarterbacks Club. He hosted several Big Ten Conference coaches during Rose Bowl appearances.

Head coaching record

Football

References

1893 births
1955 deaths
American football guards
American football halfbacks
American football quarterbacks
American men's basketball players
Arkansas Razorbacks football coaches
Baylor Bears athletic directors
Baylor Bears football coaches
Baylor Bears men's basketball coaches
Chicago Maroons football players
Chicago Maroons men's basketball players
Iowa State Cyclones football coaches
Rush Medical College alumni
YMCA leaders
Coaches of American football from Illinois
Players of American football from Chicago
Basketball coaches from Illinois
Basketball players from Chicago
Physicians from California